Route 37 is a bus and former streetcar route operated by the Southeastern Pennsylvania Transportation Authority (SEPTA) in Philadelphia, Pennsylvania.

Route description
Starting at Snyder station on the Broad Street Line, the route follows Passyunk Avenue and Essington Avenue to the Eastwick Industrial Park. Some peak hour trips bypass the Park via 61st Street, Lindbergh Boulevard, and 84th Street. It then continues along Bartram Avenue, loops counterclockwise through Philadelphia International Airport, and reaches the Chester Transportation Center via Industrial Highway / PA 291 and local streets, with a short detour along Morton Avenue to Harrah's Philadelphia Casino & Racetrack.

History

Street car service
The original trolley service, nicknamed the "Chester Short Line", ran between Chester and 3rd & Jackson Streets in South Philadelphia. On February 15, 1911, the service was extended to Center City via the Subway-Surface tunnel.

Overnight service operated via Elmwood Avenue instead of Woodland, replacing Route 36 between Island Road and 49th Street.

During World War II, Route 37 carried thousands of industrial workers to jobs at Westinghouse Electric, the Baldwin Locomotive Works, and Sun Shipbuilding. Six special shift-change branches ran to and from Sun Shipbuilding (37A, 37B, 37C and 37D) and Westinghouse (37E and 37F) from destinations not on the regular Route 37.

Bus service
At 1:18 a.m. on August 28, 1946, a crowded trolley collided with a truck on the Crum Creek Bridge. Both vehicles caught fire; fortunately all the passengers escaped without injury. However, the bridge was destroyed, severing the trolley line to Chester. Buses replaced trolleys between Westinghouse Loop (Lester Road) and Chester. The remainder of the route was converted to bus operation on November 5, 1955. The new service ran to  station in South Philadelphia instead of Center City, replacing the Route 81 bus on Passyunk Avenue. Trolley service between Center City and Westinghouse Loop was transferred to Route 36.

In the mid-1970s, due to Airport expansion and construction of I-95, service in the Airport area was rerouted via Lindbergh Boulevard, 84th Street and Bartram Avenue.
New service was introduced to the Eastwick Industrial Park on June 21, 1981, and then rerouted past the nearby Auto Mall on September 9, 1990. Service to the PNC Eastwick Center began on September 13, 1988. A stop for Harrah's Philadelphia (the former site of Sun Shipbuilding) was added on September 3, 2006.

References

External links

5 ft 2¼ in gauge railways in the United States
Railway lines closed in 1955
37
37
Streetcars in Pennsylvania
Tram routes in Philadelphia
Transportation in Philadelphia